The 2013–14 University of North Dakota women's basketball team represents the University of North Dakota during the 2013–14 NCAA Division I women's basketball season. They are led by second year head coach Travis Brewster and play their home games at the Betty Engelstad Sioux Center. They were members of the Big Sky Conference. They finish the season 22–10, 15–5 in Big Sky play to win the Big Sky Regular Season. They were also champions of the Big Sky Women's Basketball Tournament for the first time in program history to earn an automatic trip to the 2014 NCAA Division I women's basketball tournament where they lost in the first round to Texas A&M.

Roster

Schedule

|-
!colspan=9 style="background:#009E60; color:#000000;"| Exhibition

|-
!colspan=9 style="background:#009E60; color:#000000;"| Regular season

|-
!colspan=9 style="background:#009E60; color:#000000;"| Big Sky tournament

|-
!colspan=9 style="background:#009E60; color:#000000;"| NCAA tournament

References

North Dakota Fighting Hawks women's basketball seasons
North Dakota
North Dakota
North Dakota Fighting Hawks
North Dakota Fighting Hawks